Mengusovce is a village and municipality in Poprad District in the Prešov Region of northern Slovakia. It lies on the foothills of High Tatras.

Geography
The municipality lies at an altitude of 825 metres and covers an area of 8.944 km². It has a population of about 610 people.

History
In historical records the village was first mentioned in 1398.

Infrastructure and economy
Mengusovce has a horse riding club. There are several boarding houses and private accommodations. The village is known for its annual rodeo festival.

References

External links
https://web.archive.org/web/20170510080607/http://mengusovce.e-obce.sk/

Villages and municipalities in Poprad District